The United States Senate Caucus on International Narcotics Control (also known as the Senate Narcotics Caucus) is a U.S.  congressional caucus created to monitor and encourage the U.S. government and private programs seeking to expand international cooperation against drug abuse and narcotics trafficking, and promote international compliance with narcotics control treaties, including eradication.

As a formal organization of the United States Senate, the Caucus has the status of a standing committee. It has subpoena power and is authorized to take testimony of witnesses and to produce books, records, papers, and documents that it deems necessary. In the past it has dealt with international cooperation, eradication, trafficking, interdiction, border control, drug strategies, assessments of Federal programs, and money laundering issues.

The Caucus has held numerous hearings over the years and has issued a number of reports on U.S. narcotics control policy. The primary responsibilities of the INCC have involved monitoring of compliance with international narcotics control treaties and agreements, and oversight of U.S. counter narcotics policy and activities.

Establishment
The United States Senate Caucus on International Narcotics Control was originally called the United States Commission on International Narcotics Control, when it was established on August 16, 1985, by the Foreign Relations Authorization Act for fiscal 1986 and 1987.

Pursuant to the Legislative Branch Appropriations Act of 1986, the name of the Commission was changed to the United States Senate Caucus on International Narcotics Control, effective November 13, 1985. (The House of Representatives had requested the name change because it would more accurately reflect the membership of the group, given that no House Members were to be appointed to it.)

Membership
The group's authorizing legislation provided that the Commission draw its membership from the Senate and from experts in the private sector. Specifically, the group was to be composed of 12 members, seven Members of the U.S. Senate appointed by the President of the Senate, and five members from the private sector appointed by the President of the United States. Four of the seven Senators, including one designated as Chairman, were to be selected from the majority party after consultation with the Majority Leader, and three, including the Member designated as Co-Chairman, were to be selected from the minority party, after consultation with the Minority Leader. The five Commission members selected from the private sector were to be appointed by the President after consultation with the Members of the appropriate congressional committees.

The appointment of private citizens was discontinued after 1987 in accordance with the group's redesignation as the U.S. Senate Caucus on International Narcotics Control.

Members

118th Congress

117th Congress

116th Congress

Source:

References

External links
Official Website of the United States Senate Caucus on International Narcotics Control

Narcotics Control
Narcotics Control
Drug policy organizations based in the United States
1985 establishments in the United States